14th Politburo may refer to:
 14th Politburo of the Chinese Communist Party
 Politburo of the 14th Congress of the All-Union Communist Party (Bolsheviks)
 14th Politburo of the Communist Party of Czechoslovakia
 14th Politburo of the Romanian Communist Party
 14th Politburo of the Communist Party of Czechoslovakia
 14th Politburo of the Hungarian Socialist Workers' Party